The surname Løken or Loken may refer to:

 Astrid Løken (1911–2008), Norwegian entomologist and member of the Norwegian resistance movement during WW II
 Bård Løken (born 1964), Norwegian photographer
 Johan Christen Løken (born 1944), Norwegian politician for the Conservative Party 
 Karl Petter Løken (born 1966), Norwegian football player
 Kristian Løken (1884–1961), Norwegian military officer
 Håkon Løken (1859–1923), Norwegian jurist, journalist, newspaper editor and non-fiction writer
 Hjalmar Løken (1852–1932), Norwegian jurist and newspaper editor
 Martin Løken (1863–1942), Norwegian politician for the Liberal Party
 Monica Løken, Norwegian handball player
 Olaug Løken (1854–1925), Norwegian writer and activist
 Sverre Løken (born 1960), Norwegian rower
 Brent Loken, ecologist, social scientist, conservationist, and social entrepreneur
 George Fredrick Loken (1906–1975), Canadian businessman and politician in Saskatchewan
 James B. Loken (born 1940), American judge on the US Court of Appeals
 Kristanna Loken (born 1979), American actress and model
 Newt Loken (1919–2011), American artistic gymnast and coach

Norwegian-language surnames